Access Interviews (known as AI) was a website founded by journalist and author Rob McGibbon, that collated an index of journalistic interviews from across the world. The website was launched on 7 January 2008 and was developed by the UK technology company Mettic.
It was shut down in September 2015.

Publishers of newspapers and magazines and broadcasters in television and radio promoted their exclusive interviews by linking to Access Interviews, which held a synopsis of content, which then drove traffic back to the copyright holder.

Access Interviews operated an open editorial platform, so individual journalists could add portfolios of their work and general users could add links to interviews with their favourite subjects and share their findings with other like-minded people.

References

External links
 Accessinterviews.com website
 Rob McGibbon's website
 https://web.archive.org/web/20090122230845/http://mettic.net/

British news websites